The Copa Colombia; officially known as Copa BetPlay Dimayor is an annual football tournament in Colombia. It is contested by the 36 professional clubs of DIMAYOR and is the nation's domestic cup competition, equivalent to the FA Cup in England or the Copa del Rey in Spain.

The Copa Colombia was played for the first time in 1950, and it has been played consecutively since its revival in 2008. The most successful club is Atlético Nacional, with four titles.

Millonarios are the current holders, who won their third Copa Colombia against Junior, winning the final series by a 2–1 aggregate score.

History 

The Copa Colombia was created in 1950 by DIMAYOR, after the first two editions of the professional league. It was won by Boca Juniors de Cali, who defeated Santa Fe with an aggregate score of 7–6.

The existence of the next edition, 1951–52, is disputed according to different sources. RSSSF indicate the tournament was won by Boca Juniors, defeating Millonarios in the finals with an aggregate score of 3–2. However, comutricolor.com state that Boca Juniors faced Millonarios in a previous round of the 1952–53 edition (the Winners Round) and both team met  again in the final, with Millonarios defeating Boca Juniors with an aggregate score of 5–0. The Liga Postobon site indicates the only events competed were in 1950/51 and 1952/53. The official website of Millonarios also ignore the 1951–52 edition, taking as second title the won in the 1962–63 edition. The next edition of the tournament was played three years later, in 1956, however it was cancelled while it was played.

As with previous editions, there are doubts about the existence of the 1962–63 tournament. Some sources said Millonarios defeated Deportivo Cali in the finals with an aggregate score of 5–3; however other sources said this trophy was given to Millonarios as a commemorative title because they won the three previous editions of the league consecutively.

The cup would not be played until 1981, when the tournament was included as a part of the league. The champion of the cup automatically qualified to the Final Stage of the league for the next season. For this tournament participated in the First Group the teams that not qualified to the Quadrangular Stage in the league and in the Second Group the teams eliminated in the Quadrangular Stage. The winners of each group, Deportivo Cali and Independiente Medellín, faced in the Finals, where Medellín won with an aggregate score of 4–2.

In 1989, another edition was played as a part of the league. The top four teams of the tournament won bonus point in the league in this order: 0.500, 0.375, 0.250 and 0.125. In the Finals, Santa Fe defeated Unión Magdalena, after drawing 0–0 in the first match and winning the second 2–1. The top four teams of the tournament were Santa Fe, Unión Magdalena, Junior and América de Cali. This was the last edition of the Copa Colombia until 2008.

On 14 February 2008, the 36 members of the DIMAYOR decided to organise a new national cup. As a DIMAYOR decision, it would be contested by all its members: the first and second division of Colombian football. The new tournament was called Copa Postobón, due to sponsorship with Postobón, who was also the sponsor of the league. The first edition of the new cup was won by La Equidad.

In 2015, the tournament is sponsored by the brewery company Bavaria, manufacturer of Águila beer, so the cup was renamed as Copa Águila.

Since 2020, the tournament is sponsored by the sports betting house Betplay, so the cup was renamed as Copa Betplay Dimayor.

Editions

Copa Colombia

Source: RSSSF (Note: some editions cited in RSSSF as official are not considered official by all sources)

Copa Colombia (Copa Postobón)

Copa Colombia (Copa Águila)

Copa Colombia (Copa Betplay Dimayor)

Titles by club

References

 
Football competitions in Colombia
Colombia
1950 establishments in Colombia
Recurring sporting events established in 1950